Ray Gilhooley (15 July 1887, in New York City, New York – 18 September 1973, in New Milford, Connecticut  ) was an American racecar driver.

Indy 500 results

References

Indianapolis 500 drivers
1887 births
1973 deaths
Racing drivers from New York City